The Family Values Tour 1999 is the second live album that features select live performances from the 1999 Family Values Tour, and it was released on May 23, 2000, through Interscope Records. The album is produced by Jeff Kwatinetz and Bill Sheppell.

History
Ja Rule, Run DMC, Mobb Deep also appeared on the Tour (in place of DMX, who canceled prior to the beginning of the tour). Korn made surprise appearances at a handful of dates. Sevendust filled in for Filter on the Denver date while Filter took time off to film the video for "Take A Picture". System of a Down were originally on the line-up but canceled their appearance due to a feud with Limp Bizkit. The Minneapolis date was the only that featured both Primus and Korn.

Track listing

Dates
 09/21 - Pittsburgh, PA at Civic Arena
 09/28 - Worcester, MA at Worcester Centrum
 10/2 - Uniondale, NY at Nassau Coliseum
 10/3 - Philadelphia, PA at First Union Center
 10/5 - Grand Rapids, MI at Van Andel Arena
 10/6 - Indianapolis, IN at Market Square Arena
 10/8 - Columbus, OH at Schottenstein Center
 10/9 - Rosemont, IL at Allstate Arena
 10/10 - St. Louis, MO at Kiel Center
 10/12 - Kansas City, MO at Kemper Arena
 10/13 - Minneapolis, MN at Target Center
 10/16 - Portland, OR at Rose Garden Arena
 10/17 - Tacoma, WA at Tacoma Dome
 10/19 - San Francisco, CA at Cow Palace
 10/20 - Sacramento, CA at ARCO Arena
 10/22 - Phoenix, AZ at America West Arena
 10/23 - Anaheim, CA at Arrowhead Pond
 10/25 - Denver, CO at Pepsi Center
 10/27 - Dallas, TX at Reunion Arena
 10/28 - Houston, TX at Compaq Center
 10/30 - San Antonio, TX at Alamodome
 10/31 - Biloxi, MS at Mississippi Coast Coliseum

Charts

Weekly charts

Year-end charts

References

1999 live albums
1999 compilation albums